Barchan (also Romanized as Bārchān; also known as Bārchūn) is a village in Garkan Rural District, Garkan-e Jonubi District, Mobarakeh County, Isfahan Province, Iran. As of the 2006 census, its population was 657, with there being 169 families.

References 

Populated places in Mobarakeh County